Telmatoblechnum is a genus of ferns in the family Blechnaceae, subfamily Stenochlaenoideae.

Species
, the Checklist of Ferns and Lycophytes of the World and Plants of the World Online accepted two species:
Telmatoblechnum indicum (Burm.f.) Perrie, D.J.Ohlsen & Brownsey
Telmatoblechnum serrulatum (Rich.) Perrie, D.J.Ohlsen & Brownsey

References

Blechnaceae